Room Alone 2 is a 2015–2016 Thai television series which serves as a sequel to Room Alone 401-410.

Directed by Nuttapong Mongkolsawas and produced by GMMTV, the series was one of the two television series announced by GMMTV on 25 August 2015 along with Wonder Teacher. It premiered on One31,  and LINE TV on 4 October 2015, airing on Sundays at 14:00 ICT, 15:00 ICT and 21:00 ICT, respectively. The series concluded on 24 January 2016.

Cast and characters 
Below are the cast of the series:

Main 
 Anchasa Mongkhonsamai as Jaegun
 Achirawich Saliwattana (Gun) as Earng
 Maripha Siripool (Wawa) as Baitoey
 Phakjira Kanrattanasoo (Nanan) as Min
 Suwittayawat Pariyawit as Men
 Jirakit Kuariyakul (Toptap) as Tul
 Chatchawit Techarukpong (Victor) as Terk
 Jirakit Thawornwong (Mek) as View
 Worranit Thawornwong (Mook) as Snow
 Jumpol Adulkittiporn (Off) as Puen
 Thitipoom Techaapaikhun (New) as Ray
 Phurikulkrit Chusakdiskulwibul (Amp) as Gang
 Sattaphong Phiangphor (Tao) as Tent

Supporting 
 Natthawat Chainarongsophon (Gun) as Camp
 Kornrawich Sungkibool (Junior) as Thanoo
 Tawan Vihokratana (Tawan) as Warm
 Ramida Jiranorraphat (Jane) as Ploen
 Puwadon Vejvongsa as Kin
 Oranicha Krinchai (Proud) as Ampere
 Phanuphong Wongthom as Cable
 Sarunchana Apisamaimongkol (Aye) as Namhorm
 Sapol Assawamunkong (Great) as Key
 Leo Saussay
 Kanut Rojanai (Baan) as Home
 Tatchakorn Boonlapayanan (Godji)
 Chanathip Phisutereewong (Bank) as Talay, Warm's friend

Guest role 
 Patcha Poonpiriya (June) as Air (Ep. 12)
 Nattatida Damrongwisetphanit (Pear)

References

External links 
 GMMTV

Television series by GMMTV
Thai romance television series
Thai drama television series
2015 Thai television series debuts
2016 Thai television series endings
One 31 original programming